Schefflera polyclada is a plant species found in Papua New Guinea. It is an extant taxon.

References

polyclada
Endemic flora of Papua New Guinea